Gambart is a small lunar impact crater on the Mare Insularum, near the central region of the Moon. It is named after French astronomer Jean-Félix Adolphe Gambart. It can be located to the south-southeast of the prominent ray crater Copernicus. In the past, the floor of Gambart has been flooded with lava, leaving a relatively flat surface surrounded by a smooth but somewhat polygon-shaped outer rim. To the southwest of Gambart is an area of hilly terrain deposited from ejecta during the Mare Imbrium impact, known as the Fra Mauro Formation.

The smaller Gambart C crater is located to the northeast of Gambart itself.  Roughly between Gambart and Gambart C is a lunar dome, a type of shield volcano. The Surveyor 2 probe crashed to the northeast of Gambart C.

Satellite craters
By convention these features are identified on lunar maps by placing the letter on the side of the crater midpoint that is closest to Gambart.

Images

References

External links

Gambart at The Moon Wiki
 Lunar Orbiter 1 photo 135, showing part of Gambart crater and the area to the northwest

Related articles
 
  - Gambart-type craters
  - Gambart B, C and environs

Impact craters on the Moon